Tharrawaddy Township is a township in Tharrawaddy District in the Bago Region of Burma. The principal town is Tharrawaddy.

References

Townships of the Bago Region
Tharrawaddy District